Res Gestae Divi Augusti (Eng. The Deeds of the Divine Augustus) is a monumental inscription composed by the first Roman emperor, Augustus, giving a first-person record of his life and accomplishments. The Res Gestae is especially significant because it gives an insight into the image Augustus offered to the Roman people. Various portions of the Res Gestae have been found in modern Turkey. The inscription itself is a monument to the establishment of the Julio-Claudian dynasty that was to follow Augustus.

Structure
The text consists of a short introduction, 35 body paragraphs and a posthumous addendum. The paragraphs are conventionally grouped in four sections, political career, public benefactions, military accomplishments and a political statement.

The first section (paragraphs 2–14) is concerned with Augustus' political career; it records the offices and political honours that he held. Augustus also lists numerous offices he refused to take and privileges he refused to be awarded. The second section (paragraphs 15–24) lists Augustus' donations of money, land and grain to the citizens of Italy and his soldiers, as well as the public works and gladiatorial spectacles that he commissioned. The text is careful to point out that all this was paid for out of Augustus' own funds. The third section (paragraphs 25–33) describes his military deeds and how he established alliances with other nations during his reign. Finally the fourth section (paragraphs 34–35) consists of a statement of the Romans' approval for the reign and deeds of Augustus. The appendix is written in the third person and likely not by Augustus himself. It summarizes the entire text, lists various buildings that he renovated or constructed and states that Augustus spent 600 million silver denarii (24 million gold aurei) from his own funds during his reign on public projects. Ancient currencies cannot be reliably converted into modern equivalents, but it is clearly more than anyone else in the empire could afford. Augustus consolidated his hold on power by reversing the prior tax policy beginning with funding the aerarium militare with 170 million sesterces of his own money.

History
According to the text it was written just before Augustus' death in AD 14, but it was probably written years earlier and likely went through many revisions. Augustus left the text with his will, which instructed the Senate to set up the inscriptions.  The original, which has not survived, was engraved upon a pair of bronze pillars and placed in front of Augustus' mausoleum.  Many copies of the text were made and carved in stone on monuments or temples throughout the Roman Empire, some of which have survived; most notably, almost a full copy, written in the original Latin and a Greek translation was preserved on a temple to Augustus in Ancyra (the Monumentum Ancyranum of Ankara, Turkey); others have been found at Apollonia and Antioch, both in Pisidia.

Content
The text is not a full account of the years between 44 BC, the assassination of Augustus' adoptive father Julius Caesar, and AD 14, the year in which he died. Instead, it is a personal account of the first Emperor's life and those achievements that he decided to be worth remembering by the Roman people. It is an independent self-depiction that is written in a literary form which is unique to the ancient world, and it must be read as such. This period of history is seen from Augustus' perspective and the author presents facts that relate only to himself. Augustus' enemies are never mentioned by name. Caesar's murderers Brutus and Cassius are called simply "those who killed my father". Mark Antony and Sextus Pompey, Augustus' opponents in the East, remain equally anonymous; the former is "he with whom I fought the war," while the latter is merely a "pirate". One writer, Werner Eck, says that it cannot be stated that Augustus made any false statements. Any comprehensive understanding of this period of Roman history should be supplemented by statements from other ancient sources, archaeology, and inscriptions.

The introduction and first two pararagraphs of the inscription found at the Monumentum Ancyranum of Ankara read as such:

See also
 Lucius Cornelius Scipio Barbatus, whose sarcophagus carries a short inscription in Saturnian metre commemorating his deeds
 Behistun Inscription, commissioned by Darius I of Persia
 Res Gestae (disambiguation)

References

Sources
 Barini, Concetta (1937),  Res Gestae Divi Augusti ex Monumentis Ancyrano, Antiocheno, Apolloniensi, Rome.
 Cooley, Alison (2009),  Res Gestae divi Augusti: Text, Translation and Commentary, Cambridge: Cambridge University Press, 2009. 
 Eck, Werner (2006), The Age of Augustus, London: Blackwell. 
 Gagé, Jean (1935), Res gestae divi Augusti ex monumentis Ancyrano et Antiocheno latinis, Paris.
 Mommsen, Theodor (1865). Res gestae Divi Augusti ex monumentis Ancyrano et Apolloniensi. Berolini: Weidmannos, 1865.
 Scheid. John (2007).  Res Gestae Divi Augusti: hauts faits du divin Auguste. Paris: Belles Lettres, 2007. 
 Volkmann, Hans (1942), Res gestae Divi Augusti Das Monumentum Ancyranum, Leipzig.

External links

 The Res Gestae at LacusCurtius, in Latin, Greek and English
 The Res Gestae (in Latin) at The Latin Library
 The Res Gestae at the Internet Classics Archive (in English)
 Life and deeds of Augustus (in English)

Augustus
Latin works about history
Roman religion inscriptions
Latin inscriptions
1st-century Latin texts
1st-century inscriptions
Works about ancient Rome